Belinda Jane Charteris  (née Blair; born 10 May 1972 in Christchurch) is a New Zealand former international netball representative, who played in the Silver Ferns team that won a silver medal at the 1998 Commonwealth Games in Kuala Lumpur.
 She also played for the Canterbury Flames in the National Bank Cup, retiring after the 2004 season. In the 2009 Queen's Birthday Honours, Charteris was appointed a Member of the New Zealand Order of Merit, for services to netball.

Her mother is Judy Blair, who captained the Silver Ferns in 1967.

References 

New Zealand netball players
New Zealand international netball players
Netball players at the 1998 Commonwealth Games
Commonwealth Games silver medallists for New Zealand
Members of the New Zealand Order of Merit
Cricketers from Christchurch
Living people
1972 births
Commonwealth Games medallists in netball
Netball players from Christchurch
1995 World Netball Championships players
1999 World Netball Championships players
Otago Rebels players
Canterbury Flames players
Medallists at the 1998 Commonwealth Games